

Blue ice occurs when snow falls on a glacier, is compressed, and becomes part of the glacier.  During compression, air bubbles are squeezed out, so ice crystals enlarge. This enlargement is responsible for the ice's blue colour.

Small amounts of regular ice appear to be white because of air bubbles inside and also because small quantities of water appear to be colourless. In glaciers, the pressure causes the air bubbles to be squeezed out, increasing the density of the created ice. Large quantities of water are blue, as it absorbs other colours more efficiently than blue. A large piece of compressed ice, or a glacier, similarly appears blue.

The blue color is sometimes wrongly attributed to Rayleigh scattering, which is responsible for the color of the sky. Rather, water ice is blue for the same reason that large quantities of liquid water are blue: it is a result of an overtone of an oxygen–hydrogen (O−H) bond stretch in water, which absorbs light at the red end of the visible spectrum. In the case of oceans or lakes, some of the light hitting the surface of water is reflected back directly, but most of it penetrates the surface, interacting with its molecules. The water molecule can vibrate in different modes when light hits it. The red, orange, yellow, and green wavelengths of light are absorbed so that the remaining light is composed of the shorter wavelengths of blue and violet. This is the main reason why the ocean is blue. So, water owes its intrinsic blueness to selective absorption in the red part of its visible spectrum. The absorbed photons promote transitions to high overtone and combination states of the nuclear motions of the molecule, i.e. to highly excited vibrations. 

An example of blue ice was observed in Tasman Glacier, New Zealand in January 2011.

Antarctic runways

Blue ice is exposed in areas of the Antarctic where there is no net addition or subtraction of snow.  That is, any snow that falls in that area is counteracted by sublimation or other losses. Such areas are known as blue-ice areas.  These areas have been used as runways (e.g. Wilkins Runway, Novolazarevskaya, Patriot Hills Base Camp) due to their hard surface, which is suitable for aircraft fitted with wheels rather than skis.

References

External links

Glaciology of Blue Ice Areas in Antarctica

Bodies of ice
Glaciology